The Simon Trophy was a South African women's cricket club cup trophy, awarded annually to the Annual Inter Provincial Tournament champions.  The trophy was presented to the Southern Transvaal Association by Tilly Mary Simon to hand over to the South African Association upon its formation.  It was first awarded in the 1950–51 season.

Past winners (incomplete)

References

South African domestic cricket competitions
Women's cricket competitions in South Africa
Cricket awards and rankings